This is a list of town tramway systems in Belgium by region and province.  It tables all tram systems, both past (including vicinal tramways) and present. Cities with currently operating systems, and those systems themselves, are indicated in bold and blue background colored rows. Known tram systems that operated on tracks other than standard gauge are indicated in the 'Notes' column.

Brussels

Flanders

Antwerp Province

East Flanders

Flemish Brabant

Limburg

West Flanders

Wallonia

Hainaut

Liège Province

Namur

See also

Brussels Intercommunal Transport Company (STIB/MIVB)
Flemish Transport Company "De Lijn"
List of metro systems
List of town tramway systems in Europe
List of tram and light rail transit systems
List of trolleybus systems
Opérateur de transport de Wallonie

References

Bibliography
Books, Periodicals and External Links

Tramways
Belgium